Aileen is an Irish feminine given name, a variant of Eileen.

People
Aileen Adams (born 1923), British consultant anaesthetist
Aileen Allen (1888–1950), American diver
Aileen Armitage (born 1930), British writer and author
Aileen Baviera (1959–2020), Filipino political scientist and sinologist
Aileen Bernal (born 1994), Panamanian model and beauty pageant contestant winner
Aileen Britton (1916–1986), Australian actress
Aileen Bryan (1925–2005), American sailor
Aileen Campbell (born 1980), Scottish politician
Aileen Cannon (born 1981), American lawyer and federal judge
Aileen Carroll (1944–2020), Canadian politician
Aileen Christianson (1944–2020), English lecturer
Aileen Convery (born 1969), Irish swimmer
Aileen H. Cowan (born 1926), Canadian painter and sculptor
Aileen Crowley (born 1994), Irish rower
Aileen Cust (1868–1937), Anglo-Irish veterinary surgeon, a first
Aileen Dent (1890–1978), Australian artist
Aileen Despard (1908–1981), Irish actress
Aileen Donnelly, Irish judge
Aileen Eagleton (1902–1984), British painter and wood engraver
Aileen Eaton (1909–1987), American boxing and wrestling promoter
Aileen Mary Elliott (1896–1966), British artist
Aileen Fisher (1906–2002), American writer, poet, and children's author
Aileen Fox (1907–2005), English archaeologist
Aileen Frisch (born 1992), South Korean-Slovenian luger
Aileen Fyfe, British historian
Aileen Galvin (born 1968), Scottish cricketer
Aileen Garmson (1863–1951), New Zealand trade unionist and political activist
Aileen Geving (born 1987), American curler
Aileen Gilroy (born 1993), Australian rules footballer
Aileen de Graaf (born 1990), Dutch darts player
Aileen Griffiths (1918–2007), Australian community worker
Aileen Gunther (born 1954), American state politician and nurse
Aileen Hernandez (1926–2017), American union organizer and civil right activist
Aileen Keel (born 1952), Scottish medical doctor and academic
Aileen S. Kraditor (1928–2020), American historian
Aileen Lawlor, Irish Gaelic football referee 
Aileen Lee (born 1970), American businesswoman
Aileen Elizabeth Lynch (1898–1983), Australian public servant and politician
Aileen MacDonald, Australian politician
Aileen MacKeogh (1952–2005), Irish sculptor and academic
Aileen Manning (1886–1946), American actress
Aileen Marson (1912–1939), British actress
Aileen Marty, Cuban scientist
Aileen McColgan, British barrister and academic
Aileen McCorkell (1921–2010), British businesswoman
Aileen McGlynn (born 1973), Scottish Paralympic cyclist
Aileen McLeod (born 1971), Scottish politician
Aileen Meagher (1910–1987), Canadian relay runner
Aileen Mehle (1918–2016), American columnist
Aileen Mills (born 1962), English track and field athlete
Aileen Morales (born 1987), American softball coach
Aileen Moreton-Robinson (born 1956), Australian academic, feminist, author, and activist
Aileen Morrison (born 1982), Irish triathlete
Aileen Neilson (born 1971), Scottish wheelchair curler
Aileen Noonan (born 1950), Irish chess player
Aileen O'Brien (1913–2000), American writer, journalist, and political activist
Aileen O'Toole, Irish former journalist, newspaper founder, & consultant
Aileen Osofsky (1926–2010), American community leader, philanthropist and bridge player
Aileen Palmer (1915–1988), British-Australian poet and diarist
Aileen Passloff (1931–2020), American dancer and teacher
Aileen Paterson (1934–2018), Scottish writer and illustrator
Aileen Pippett (1895–1974), British journalist and biographer
Aileen Plant (died 2007), Australian expert in infectious diseases
Aileen Plunket (1904–1999), Anglo-Irish hostess
Aileen Pringle (1895–1989), American actress
Aileen Quinn (born 1971), American actress
Aileen Raymond (1910–2005), English television and stage actress
Aileen Ribeiro, English historian
Aileen Richards, Welsh businesswoman
Aileen Riggin (1906–2002), American swimmer and diver
Aileen Roberts, 2nd Countess Roberts (1870–1944), British noblewoman
Aileen B. Ryan (1912–1987), American politician
Aileen Shaw (born 1945), Australian figure skater
Aileen Stace (1895–1977), New Zealand craftswoman, spinner, and spinning teacher
Aileen Stanley (1893–1982), American singer
Aileen Cole Stewart (1893–1997), African American U.S. Army nurse
Aileen Tan (born 1966), Singaporean actress
Aileen Thomas (1907–Unknown), Canadian fencer
Aileen Ward (1919–2016), American professor
Aileen Osborn Webb (1892–1979), American aristocrat and crafter
Aileen Whelan (born 1991), English footballer
Aileen Williams (1924–2015), Canadian activist
Aileen Wilson (born 1984), British high jumper
Aileen Wuornos (1956-2002), American serial killer, robber, and prostitute
Aileen Yingst, American geologist and scientist

Feminine given names
English feminine given names
Scottish feminine given names